Hemaris aksana, the Atlas bee hawkmoth, is a moth of the family Sphingidae. The species was first described by Ferdinand Le Cerf in 1923. It is known from the Middle and High Atlas Mountains of Morocco. The habitat consists of flower-rich meadows at elevations between 1,300 and 2,500 meters.

The wingspan is 44–51 mm. It is a diurnal species. Although mimicking a bumble bee in coloration, its flight is much more rapid and agile. Adults are on wing in March, June and August. At higher altitude, the flight period is the latter half of May or June. Here, there is generally one generation per year, although a partial second generation may occur in August.

The larvae have been recorded feeding on Scabiosa species.

References

A
Endemic fauna of Morocco
Moths of Asia
Moths described in 1923
Moths of Africa